Richard O'Carroll (29 February 1876 – 5 May 1916) was an Irish trade union leader, military officer, politician and founding member of the Irish Labour Party. He was also an early critic of child labour, particularly in the construction industry, and under his leadership the construction industry took a public stance against child labour for the first time.

Career
Lieutenant Councillor O'Carroll was a bricklayer by trade and General Secretary of the Ancient Guild of Incorporated Brick and Stonelayers Trade Union from 1906 until his death in 1916. Having been active in the Union since early in his career, as General Secretary, O'Carroll was instrumental in growing the Union outside Dublin for the first time in its history. By the time of his death, the Union had local branches and a membership base across Ireland.

In 1907 O'Carroll was elected to Dublin City Council as an Independent Councillor. His role was likely a politically complex and delicate one, as he was now both a Trade Union leader and politician, meaning he represented both the workers of an industry and the people of a city simultaneously. In 1912 he became a founding member of the "Dublin Labour Party", the political wing of the Irish Trades Union Congress and a precursor to the Labour Party. Previously he had been a member of Sinn Féin.

In 1911 Cllr. O'Carroll became a Poor Law Guardian on the South Dublin Poor Law Union Board. Vehemently opposed to the use of child labour in the building trade and exploitation of children in trade generally, Cllr. O'Carroll tabled a motion to the Board proposing that no Dublin City Council contracts be awarded to contractors who used child labour. He openly and vociferously criticised the South Dublin Poor Law Union after this motion was defeated. However, under his leadership the Ancient Guild of Incorporated Brick and Stonelayers Trade Union went on to publicly declare opposition to the exploitation of children in the building trade. This was an important and perhaps even a pioneering stance, considering the frequent use of child labour in the construction industry in 1911.  

In 1912 Cllr. O'Carroll succeeded James Larkin as representative of the Dublin Labour Party on Dublin City Council. He continued in this role into 1913 and the period of tremendous industrial unrest during the Dublin lock-out. He was a member of the conciliation board which played a key role in ending the lock-out, while also providing public support for the disenfranchised labourers who had been denied the right to unionise: a week after Bloody Sunday in 1913, during which he had been badly beaten by police at a banned Trade Union meeting, Cllr. O'Carroll addressed a large crowd at Nelson's Pillar  along with Larkin and other key leaders, urging the public to vote for Labour representation to improve the civil rights of workers.

Cllr. O'Carroll was re-elected to Dublin City Council on the Dublin Labour Party ticket again in 1915.

1916 Easter Rising
O'Carroll was a member of the revolutionary Nationalist group Irish Republican Brotherhood as well as the Irish Volunteers. He participated in the Easter Rising of 1916, fighting in the Camden Street area as a lieutenant of 2nd Battalion under the command of Thomas MacDonagh.

Death

Lieutenant Councillor Richard O'Carroll was the only serving and elected politician to be killed during the Easter Rising. 

On the afternoon of 26th April 1916, having summarily executed journalists Dickson, MacIntyre and Francis Sheehy Skeffington at Portobello Barracks that morning, Captain John Bowen Colthurst led a raid on suspected rebel hideouts in Camden Street, Dublin city centre.  It was here that Lt. Cllr. O'Carroll was found, staked out in a room above Byrne's grocery shop.  Although he surrendered immediately, Colthurst disregarded this and ordered that he be brought into the street to be summarily executed.  "So this poor terrified wretch was made to kneel down on the pavement and make his peace with God" before being shot point-blank in the chest in front of a crowd of onlookers and soldiers.

Lt. Cllr. O'Carroll did not die immediately.  Perhaps unnerved by the large audience, instead of administering a killing shot, Colthurst commandeered a passing bread van and had him taken to Portobello Infirmary, where he died nine days later.

In his April 26th report of the day's events, Colthurst claimed that Lt. Cllr. O'Carroll had been attempting to escape when he was shot: "One other man (name unknown) was captured in Byrne's and as seditious (pro-German) literature was found on him and as he had arms in his possession he was made prisoner and placed in charge of Sergeant Kelly.  Later Sergeant Kelly informed me that the man had attempted to escape but was fired upon, wounded and re-captured."  A few days later, the Portobello orderly room began an internal inquiry into Colthurst's actions, including O'Carroll's shooting.  The soldier Lieutenant Gibbon, who knew Colthurst's claim was false, overheard him outside the orderly room, coaching a sergeant (presumably Kelly) to tell the  investigating adjutant that 'The prisoner was trying to escape'.  When Colthurst noticed that he was being overheard, he moved away a few yards to be out of Gibbon's hearing.  Colthurst obviously knew that the shooting of O'Carroll had been illegal  and he was now looking for an excuse to justify it.

After Lt. Cllr. O'Carroll's murder the military authorities attempted to erase his name from the historical record: although Colthurst had been court-martialled and found 'Guilty but Insane' for the Portobello Barracks murders of the morning of April 26th, during the trial there was no discussion of the subsequent murder of Lt. Cllr. O'Carroll that afternoon.  Three months after the trial, a royal commission further examined the circumstances leading to Colthurst's crimes at Portobello Barracks.  On the first day of these proceedings, the solicitor for the Sheehy-Skeffington family attempted to read the part of Colthurst's 26th April report that covered the execution of O'Carroll, but commission chairman Sir John Simon ruled that this was outside the scope of the inquiry and so could not be heard (perhaps because the execution took place on Camden Street rather than in the Barracks with the other executions).

Legacy
Lt. Cllr. O'Carroll was buried at Glasnevin cemetery, alongside many of Ireland's nationalist leaders. In 1935 the National Graves Association and the Bricklayer's Union erected a new memorial tombstone, detailing his achievements for Ireland and commemorating his life. Furthermore, O'Carroll Villas on Cuffe Street in Dublin city centre was named after him, and in 2016 a plaque was unveiled by the Lord Mayor of Dublin at that location.

Richard O'Carroll Empowerment Bursary
The Labour Party has chosen to commemorate the life and legacy of Lt. Cllr. O'Carroll by assisting young people in continuing their education with a bursary. The competition for the bursary of €2,000 runs annually, and it began in 2016.

References

1876 births
1916 deaths
Burials at Glasnevin Cemetery
Early Sinn Féin politicians
Executed participants in the Easter Rising
Irish bricklayers
Irish nationalists
Irish revolutionaries
Irish trade unionists
Labour Party (Ireland) politicians
Members of the Irish Republican Brotherhood